The Arechi Stadium is a multi-purpose stadium in Salerno, Italy. It is currently used mostly for football matches and is the home stadium of U.S. Salernitana 1919. The stadium holds 37,800. The stadium was built to replace the former structure that was no longer fit to host the growing audience of the team. The Italy national football team has played at the stadium three times.

References

External links
 Arechi at Stadium Journey

Arechi
Arechi
Buildings and structures in Salerno
Multi-purpose stadiums in Italy
Sports venues in Campania
Arechi